Vanama Venkateswara Rao is a politician from Telangana state and a member of the Legislative Assembly constituency of Kothagudem.

Political career
Venkateswara Rao was elected as a MLA from Kothagudem for the first time in 1989. He later represented the constituency in 1999 and 2004, besides serving as a minister in the cabinet of former Chief Minister YS Rajashekhara Reddy in 2008. In the Telangana general elections of 2018, he contested on an Indian National Congress party ticket and won with a majority of 4120 votes over the nearest Telangana Rashtra Samithi party candidate Jalagam Venkat Rao.  He resigned from the Congress Party after the 2018 elections and joined the Telangana Rashtra Samithi party.

References

1944 births
Living people
Telangana Rashtra Samithi politicians
Andhra Pradesh MLAs 1989–1994
Andhra Pradesh MLAs 1999–2004
Andhra Pradesh MLAs 2004–2009
Telangana MLAs 2018–2023